Christophe Jougon (born July 10, 1995), is an Martiniquais professional footballer who plays as midfielder for Club Franciscain.

International career

International goals
Scores and results list Martinique's goal tally first.

References

External links

1995 births
Living people
Association football midfielders
Martiniquais footballers
Martinique international footballers
Club Franciscain players
2017 CONCACAF Gold Cup players
2019 CONCACAF Gold Cup players
2021 CONCACAF Gold Cup players